Pan Tak is a populated place situated in Pima County, Arizona, United States. Throughout its existence, it has been known by a number of names, including Cajote Spring, Coyote, Coyote Indian Village, Coyote Spring, Coyote Village, Coyotes Spring, Ojo de los Coyotes, and Pantak. Pan Tak become the official name as a result of a Board on Geographic Names decision in 1941. The name comes from the O'odham, meaning "coyote sits".

References

Populated places in Pima County, Arizona